Terminator: Resistance is a 2019 first-person shooter video game developed by Teyon and published by Reef Entertainment for PlayStation 4, Windows, and Xbox One. It is based on the Terminator franchise, set during the original future war depicted in the films The Terminator and Terminator 2: Judgment Day. The game was released in Europe on November 15, 2019. In the United States, the Windows version was released a day earlier through Steam, while the other versions released on January 7, 2020. An enhanced version of the game for the PlayStation 5 was released on April 30, 2021.

Gameplay 
Terminator: Resistance is set in a post-apocalyptic 2028 and 2029 Los Angeles. Players take on the role of Jacob Rivers, a soldier from the Resistance led by John Connor against Skynet's robotic killing machines. The game features multiple possible endings.

In November 2020, a free update included a new game mode called Infiltrator mode, allowing players to play as a T-800 infiltrator as it clears scavenger, resistance and Tech-Com patrols and hold-outs to locate an officer of the Resistance known as Daniel Ramirez.

Annihilation Line is downloadable content (DLC) released in December 2021. It is set during the middle of the main game's campaign mode. As Jacob Rivers, the player teams up with Kyle Reese to rescue a group of people captured by Skynet.

Plot

Main story 
On August 29, 1997, the military computer artificial intelligence defense network Skynet became self-aware and initiated a nuclear holocaust called Judgment Day. In the decades that followed, Skynet became locked in a war to exterminate the surviving remnants of humanity. Meanwhile, pockets of human survivors organized themselves into a resistance military organization dedicated to the destruction of Skynet, led by John Connor.

In 2028, Jacob Rivers becomes the sole survivor of his Resistance unit that was deployed in Pasadena after a Terminator infiltrator's attack. While evading Skynet patrols, Jacob makes an alliance with a group of human civilian survivors composed of Jennifer and her surrogate brother Patrick, an elderly man named Ryan, scavenger Colin, and hospital nurse Erin. While gathering supplies for the survivors, Jacob meets up with a Tech-Com unit led by Commander Jessica Baron, and learns that she was forced to abandon his unit during the attack on Pasadena in order to minimize further resistance casualties. Recruited into Baron's unit, Jacob is tasked with carrying out reconnaissance missions in order to cripple Skynet. While carrying out his mission, Jacob is pursued by the Terminator infiltrator unit, and receives unexpected aid from an unidentified stranger. Convinced of the threat of the infiltrator unit, Baron provides shelter to the human civilians in Jacob's care. After suffering a sabotage in the Resistance defense systems, Rivers finally disables the infiltrator unit pursuing him.

With the Infiltrator units now a known threat, John tasks Jacob with seeking out scientist Dr. Edwin Mack in order to enlist his aid for combatting Skynet. Upon meeting Mack, Jacob learns that Mack has developed the means to hack into Skynet's network and reprogram their forces into fighting for the Resistance; Skynet has been learning at a geometric rate; and Skynet has been creating Time Displacement Equipment in order to wipe out the Resistance. Mack provides Jacob the means to seek out the location of Skynet's central core, and requests Rivers to capture a Terminator's CPU in order to help reprogram Terminators for the Resistance. While carrying out his task, Jacob meets up with the Stranger, and is warned of an impending attack by Skynet. At this point, the fate of Jacob's allies become determinant on how much trust he has built up with them and whether or not he convinces them to leave the Resistance shelter; while also having to choose between warning Mack or assassinating him on Baron's orders due to an incident that left her lover killed by a Terminator.

Jacob leads an ill-fated raid on the Griffith Observatory where the Skynet Core was believed to be located. However, Jacob becomes the sole survivor once again, with the Stranger dying to protect him. To make matters worse, Skynet assaults the main Resistance Shelter, annihilating Baron's unit in the process. Left with no other choice, and knowing the true location of the Skynet Core, Jacob brings his findings to John. While meeting with John, Jacob learns that the Stranger was his future self from an alternate timeline, and had helped play a key role in assaulting Skynet with John. Jacob and John lead a main assault force on Skynet's Time Displacement Equipment, while another Resistance unit destroys the Core. Despite the Resistance being victorious, Skynet succeeds in sending three Terminators before their defeat. The first one to kill Sarah Connor; The second one to kill John as a child; and the third Terminator tasked to kill Jacob at the beginning of the game. The game ends when Jacob makes the decision to either travel back in time to protect his younger self, becoming the Stranger, or stay in the present and have another Resistance soldier take his place as the Stranger instead.

An epilogue shows an animated slideshow detailing the fates of Jacob and his allies, and the outcomes of the choices he made during the game.

Infiltrator Mode 
A lone Terminator in an unknown region of Los Angeles is dispatched by Skynet to locate and terminate Tech-Com officer Daniel Ramirez in a covert Tech-Com Bunker. To locate it, the T-800 kills multiple humans, ranging from local scavengers to garrisoned Tech-Com soldiers while also obtaining weapons from hidden caches by the aforementioned foes. Some of these weapons are iconic weapons used by the terminator models of the films, including a Minigun, an Uzi 9 mm and a Longslide laser-sighted pistol. After completing its objective of eliminating Ramirez, the T-800 accesses and sends Skynet the data related to John Connor, being the name of his mother, Sarah Connor.

Release 
In August 2013, UK video game publisher Reef Entertainment announced the acquisition of the video game rights from StudioCanal for Terminator 2: Judgment Day, and their intention to use them to create a video game with the working title Terminators: The Video Game.

Terminator: Resistance was announced in September 2019. It was developed by Poland-based Teyon, and published by Reef Entertainment. In Europe and Australia, Terminator: Resistance was released for PlayStation 4, Windows, and Xbox One on November 15, 2019. The Windows version also received a U.S. release on November 14, through Steam. In the U.S., the home console versions were delayed from December 3 to 10, 2019. The release was subsequently pushed back to January 7, 2020, due to unexpected manufacturing delays. In Europe, the game included a free prequel comic book.

A sixth film in the franchise, Terminator: Dark Fate, was released shortly prior to the game's release, but the game does not have any relation or connection to its plot or characters.

An enhanced version of the game for PlayStation 5 was announced in December 2020, and was originally set to be released on March 26, 2021, but was delayed to April 30, 2021.

Reception 

The PlayStation 4 version of Terminator: Resistance received "generally unfavorable" reviews according to Metacritic, while the other versions received "mixed or average" reviews. The Windows version received "very positive" user reviews from Steam players.

Wesley Yin-Poole of Eurogamer called it "generic and boring". Alex Avard of GamesRadar called it the best Terminator game he had ever played, but wrote that "given the series' historically poor record when it comes to interactive entertainment, that's an admittedly low bar to clear." Avard also called it the worst game he had played in 2019. Zack Zwiezen of Kotaku favorably compared it with two earlier games published in the 1990s: The Terminator: Future Shock and Skynet.

The Annihilation Line DLC received "mixed or average" reviews according to Metacritic. Aaron Potter of Push Square opined that it lacked refinement as a result of budgetary issues, while Tristan Ogilvie of IGN called it "as forgettable" as the main game. Other critics noted improvements over the main game.

Notes

References

External links 
 
 
 Terminator: Resistance at MobyGames

2019 video games
PlayStation 4 games
PlayStation 5 games
Terminator (franchise) video games
First-person shooters
Video games developed in Poland
Video games set in California
Video games set in Los Angeles
Video games set in 1997
Video games set in the 2020s
Fiction set in 2028
Fiction set in 2029
Windows games
Xbox One games
Unreal Engine games
Video games with alternate endings
Post-apocalyptic video games
Dystopian video games
Science fiction shooter video games
Teyon games
Single-player video games
Reef Entertainment games